The Kyiv Tram is a tram network which serves the Ukrainian capital Kyiv. The system was the first electric tramway in the former Russian Empire and the fourth one in Europe after the Berlin and the Budapest and Prague tramways. However, the system is being neglected, the serviced track length is decreasing at a fast rate and is replaced by buses and trolleybuses.

The Kyiv Tram system is operated by the "Kyivpastrans" municipal company which also maintains bus, trolleybus and urban rail transport in Kyiv.

History

During the Russian Empire
Before 1886, projects for the construction of a horse-drawn tramway were planned. However, none of these plans had ever proceeded to the construction stage. In 1886, engineer Amand Struve's project was approved for construction. On July 30, 1891, the first horse-drawn tramcar was set on its track. By August 1, the tram line stretched from the Tsar's Square to the Demiivska Square.

Soon after tram operations were started, many problems arose. The hilly terrain of Kyiv presented the largest problem. On Bohdan Khmelnytsky Street, a pair of horses was not enough to pull a tramcar uphill. Therefore, another two pairs of horses were added, which did not improve the situation. Thus, mechanizing the tramway by using steam-powered tramway engines was attempted as a solution to the problem. However, the steam engines produced a lot of noise, which scared the horses and people, and produced a lot of air pollution.

The slew of problems experienced by the trams shocked Struve, who in 1890, had written a letter to the City Administration of Kyiv suggesting that for increased safety and easier use, the trams would need to be powered by electricity. The administration of the Kyiv Telegraph service opposed this move since, in their opinion, the electric motors would interfere with the telephone and telegraph systems.

On May 3, 1892, the first two electric trams arrived in Kyiv. They were built by the Struve brothers in a factory located near Moscow, based on American designs. On the same day, the tramcars were tested on the flat Sahaydachny Street, and again, on May 8, on the track from Podil Street to Khreshchatyk Street.

In 1893, the money earned by the electric trams exceeded the costs of maintenance. Furthermore, the electric trams were used whenever the horse-drawn or steam-powered trams had difficulty. Nevertheless, the system's horse-drawn trams were in use until 1895, and the last steam-powered cars ran until 1904, when a power station on the so-called Dachnaya (Dachna) line to Pushcha-Vodytsia was built. This station lasted until the 1930s.

A long tram line, about 17 versts (18 kilometers) long, was laid from the Poshtova Square in the Podil neighborhood, across the Dnipro river on the Nicholas Bridge, through the Peredmostna and Nikolska Slobodka neighborhoods, and to the neighboring town of Brovary. The line was used until the mid-1930s, and was a single line with passing places. This made the trip seem longer than it really was. The cost was 35 kopecks, a fair amount of money at the time. Nevertheless, the trams were always packed with passengers.

By 1893, the city's trams easily climbed the many steep streets of Kyiv, including the Proreznay (Prorezna), Karavayevskaya (Karavaievs’ka, now the Ploscha L’va Tolstoho Street) and even the Kruglouniversitetskaya (Kruhlouniversitets’ka) Streets. In 1893, the Elektrichestvo journal wrote:

A major problem of the tram drivers at the time was the rolling stock used. When the city's railroad stock holder Lazar Brodsky died, the stock was transferred to a Belgian auction firm, and the tram system began running with Belgian Pullman tramcars with soft, sail-type cloth seats. But neither these, nor the earlier seats on the German tramcars, gave the tram drivers any comfort while standing in wind, rain, or snow, on the driver's platform on the tram.

During Soviet Ukraine
After the Russian Revolution and the Russian Civil War, reconstruction of the tramway system began. The old and outdated tramcars required restoration as the industry of the country could not manufacture new rolling stock. The reconstruction was carried out in the main tram depot of the system, the Dombal Depot. From 1928 to 1932, 80 two-axle motor tramcars and 65 trailer cars were manufactured for Kyiv. From 1932, the depot started producing four-axle tramcars. In these tramcars, the motorman's area was separated from the passenger saloon, but was not warmed during the winter.

On March 13, 1961, a major landslide hit the city's Podilske Tram Depot, burying it in clay sludge and killing most personnel on site. Additionally, dozens of people died in the tram cars and buses caught by the landslide and subsequent electrical fault and short circuit on the street intersection immediately next to the depot.

On December 30, 1978, the first high-speed tram line in the then Soviet Union was opened in Kyiv. It connected the Victory Square with the Pivdenna Borshchahivka housing estate. The same year Kyiv experienced the peak in tram routes development in its history. In 1978 the length of the lines reached 285 km, the fleet numbered 909 cars, and passenger traffic per year exceeded 396 million people.

Routes
As of May 25, 2020, the following routes are in effect:

Rolling stock
The Kyiv tram system uses many different tram cars and types, with some being designed in Moscow and manufactured in Riga, some being manufactured by the ČKD Tatra company in Prague, and with some being manufactured right in the city of Kyiv. The following data incorporates only some tram cars used by the system.

Current

Historical

References
Notes 

Footnotes

Bibliography

 
 
 

Further reading

 Mashkevych, Stefan. Tram Kopecks in Zerkalo Nedeli, October 16–22, 2004. Available in Russian and Ukrainian
 Rozhanovsky, Viktor. Struve: Uphill on the Aleksandrovsky Spusk in Zerkalo Nedeli, October 24–30, 1998. Available in Russian

External links

 "Kyivpastrans" official web site 
 In memory of Kiev Trams –  by Stefan Mashkevich 
 noosphere.com.ua – Fast tram No.2 in Kyiv 

Trams in Kyiv
Tram transport in Ukraine
Kyiv
Railway lines opened in 1891
1891 establishments in the Russian Empire